Enrico Cucchi (2 August 1965 – 4 March 1996) was an Italian professional football player, who played as a midfielder.

Career
Enrico Cucchi made his professional debut in 1981 with Savona in Serie C2, which was coached by his father Piero at the time. In 1982, he was sold to Inter and he made his Serie A debut with the club three years later, on 13 January 1985, in a 1–1 away draw against Ascoli. He became a permanent first-team member the subsequent season, making 22 appearances, and scoring a goal against Lecce, also making his European debut with the club in the UEFA Cup. After the 1986–87 season, he spent the next two seasons on loan at Empoli and Fiorentina, before returning to Inter again in 1989. During the 1989–90 season, he scored in Inter's 2–0 victory over Sampdoria in the 1989 Supercoppa Italiana. He was sold to Bari the following season, where his career declined due to illness. He was operated on his thigh due to a growing mole, which was later revealed to be melanoma. He spent his final season with Ravenna during the 1993–94 Serie B season, making only 5 appearances due to his illness, before retiring in 1995.

Style of play
Cucchi was a talented, well-rounded and versatile midfielder, who excelled at intercepting passes and breaking down opposing plays, although he was also gifted with good vision, technique, and a powerful shot from distance.

Personal life
Enrico's father, Piero Cucchi, also played football professionally, later working as a coach. In addition to his footballing career, Enrico also studied law. He died on 4 March 1996 in Tortona of stomach cancer, at the age of 30; he is survived by his wife, Sabrina. Following his death, an association for palliative care was opened in his name.

Honours
Inter
 Supercoppa Italiana winner: 1989.

References

1965 births
1996 deaths
Deaths from cancer in Piedmont
Deaths from stomach cancer
Italian footballers
Italy under-21 international footballers
Serie A players
Serie B players
Serie C players
Inter Milan players
Empoli F.C. players
ACF Fiorentina players
S.S.C. Bari players
Ravenna F.C. players
Association football midfielders